is a Japanese competitive swimmer. At the 2022 Junior Pan Pacific Championships, she won the gold medal in the 200 metre butterfly and silver medals in the 100 metre butterfly and 4×100 metre medley relay. At the 2022 World Short Course Championships, she placed sixth in the final of the 200 metre butterfly.

Career

2022 Junior Pan Pacific Championships

On the first day of competition at the 2022 Junior Pan Pacific Swimming Championships, held in August at the Veterans Memorial Aquatic Center in Honolulu, United States, Mitsui won the gold medal in the 200 metre butterfly with a Championships record and personal best time of 2:07.82, which lowered the mark 0.66 seconds from the 2:08.48 set by Cassidy Bayer of the United States six years earlier. The following day, she placed thirty-second in the 100 metre freestyle preliminaries with a personal best time of 57.79 seconds and did not advance to the evening finals. Day three of four, she won her second medal, this time finishing in a personal best time of 58.67 seconds in the final of the 100 metre butterfly to win the silver medal 0.09 seconds behind gold medalist Alex Shackell of the United States. The fourth and final day, she started the evening finals session with a third-place finish in the b-final of the 200 metre individual medley with a personal best time of 2:15.94 before winning a silver medal as part of the 4×100 metre medley relay, where she split a 58.76 for the butterfly leg of the relay to contribute to the final time of 4:04.01. When points for individual competitors were summed at the end of competition per the points they earned for their place-finishings in events, Mitsui ranked as the tenth-overall highest-scoring female competitor.

2022 World Short Course Championships
Leading up to the 2022 World Short Course Championships, Mitsui competed at the 2022 Japan Short Course Championships in October in Tokyo, winning the gold medal in the 200 metre butterfly with a personal best time of 2:04.35 and placing seventh in the 100 metre butterfly with a personal best time of 57.85 seconds. As an 18-year-old at the 2022 World Short Course Championships, conducted at Melbourne Sports and Aquatic Centre in Melbourne, Australia in December, she ranked fifth in the preliminaries of the 200 metre butterfly on day three with a time of 2:05.27 and qualified for the evening final. In the evening final, she placed sixth with a time of 2:05.40, finishing after a gold-silver sweep by two American swimmers and 5.79 seconds behind the world record of 1:59.61 set by Mireia Belmonte of Spain in 2014.

International championships (50 m)

International championships (25 m)

Personal best times

Long course meters (50 m pool)

Legend: b – b-final

Short course meters (25 m pool)

References

External links
 

2004 births
Living people
Japanese female butterfly swimmers
Japanese female medley swimmers
Japanese female freestyle swimmers
21st-century Japanese women